John D'Arco may refer to:
 John D'Arco Sr., American politician
 John D'Arco Jr., his son, American lawyer and attorney